Life or Something Like It is a 2002 American romantic comedy-drama film directed by Stephen Herek. The film focuses on television reporter Lanie Kerrigan (Angelina Jolie) and her quest to find meaning in her life. The original music score was composed by David Newman.

Plot
Lanie Kerrigan, a successful reporter for a Seattle television station, interviews a self-proclaimed prophet, Jack, to find out if he really can predict football scores. Instead, Prophet Jack not only predicts the football score, and that it will hail the next day, but also that Lanie will die in seven days, on the following Thursday. When his first two prophecies come true, Lanie panics and again meets with Jack to ask for another prophecy to test him again. Jack tells her that there will be a relatively significant earthquake in San Francisco at 9:06 am, which also happens. Now Lanie is convinced that she is going to die and is forced to reevaluate her life.

Lanie tries to find consolation in her famous baseball player boyfriend Cal Cooper and in her family, but there is little there. Her lifelong ambition of appearing on network television begins to look like a distant dream. In her desperation, she commits professional blunders but ends up finding support in an unlikely source: her archenemy, the cameraman Pete Scanlon, with whom she once had casual sex. He introduces her to a new approach to life: to live every moment of her life to the fullest and to do whatever she had always wanted to do. Lanie moves in with Pete for a day, and he introduces her to his son Tommy, who lives with his mother. They spend a whole day together with Tommy. That night Lanie and Pete sleep together for the second time. The next day Lanie receives an opportunity for a job she always dreamed of in New York. She asks Pete to come with her, but he declines, telling her that her appetite for success and fame will never end. Sadly, Lanie leaves for New York.

Pete meets Jack and tells him how wrong he is, as Lanie got the job which Jack foretold she would not get. However, Jack explains that he was right, as Lanie will never be able to get the job because she'll die before it begins. He also gives a prophecy of the death of a famous former baseball player in a plane crash. When Pete receives the news of the death of the baseball player, as foretold by Jack, he tries to call Lanie to warn her. He can't reach her, so he flies to New York.

Lanie - unconcerned with Jack's prophecy - interviews her idol, famous media personality Deborah Connors. Lanie realizes how petty the opening questions are and shares a heartfelt moment with Deborah live on air. The interview receives huge ratings. The network immediately offers her a position, but Lanie declines, realizing that she wants a life with Pete in Seattle.

As she leaves the studio, a police officer gets into a conflict with a man, who shoots a bullet into the air. Pete tries to warn Lanie from across the street, but she is shot in the crossfire. Lanie dies in the operating theatre but is revived. When she wakes up, Pete tells her that he has loved her since the first time he saw her, and Lanie tells him that she loves him too. Later, Pete, Lanie, and Tommy watch Cal's baseball game, while Lanie (in a voiceover) says that one part of her has died — the part that didn't know how to live a life.

Cast
 Angelina Jolie as Lanie Kerrigan
 Amy Esterle as 15-years-old Lanie Kerrigan (uncredited)
 Marika Anuik as 10-years-old Lanie Kerrigan
 Ashlyn Morgan Williams as 5-years-old Lanie Kerrigan
 Edward Burns as Pete Scanlon
 Tony Shalhoub as Prophet Jack
 Christian Kane as Cal Cooper
 James Gammon as Pat Kerrigan
 Melissa Errico as Andrea
 Stockard Channing as Deborah Connors
 Lisa Thornhill as Gwen
 Kasey Stevens as 5-years-old Gwem
 Gregory Itzin as Dennis
 Veena Sood as Doctor
 Jesse James Rutherford as Tommy

KOMO-TV
The majority of the movie was shot on location in Seattle, Washington, although portions were also filmed in downtown Vancouver, British Columbia. The TV station in the movie, KQMO, was actually real-life Seattle TV station KOMO-TV (the KOMO logo was altered on the set of KOMO 4 News and on several of KOMO's news vehicles, in addition to a few mic flags).

Several KOMO personalities make cameo appearances; among them are longtime anchors Dan Lewis and Margo Myers (the latter moved to KIRO-TV in January 2005), weather anchor and Front Runners host Steve Pool, and weekend weather anchor Theron Zahn. Other KOMO personalities who made brief cameo appearances include People Helper John Sharify and reporter Michelle Esteban.

Additionally, Vancouver news anchors Pamela Martin and Jill Krop, at the time both employed with BCTV, appeared briefly in scenes shot in the BCTV studios.

Reception
The film received generally unfavorable reviews. As of October 3, 2022, based on 121 reviews collected by the review aggregator website Rotten Tomatoes, Life or Something Like It has received an overall rating average of 27%, with an average score of 4.5 out of 10. Metacritic assigned the film a weighted average score of 65 out of 100 based on 42 critics, indicating "generally favorable reviews." Audiences polled by CinemaScore gave the film an average grade of "B+" on an A+ to F scale.

Jolie's performance in the film earned her a Golden Raspberry Award nomination for Worst Actress.

Box office
The film was a commercial and financial loss, grossing only $16,872,671 against its $40,000,000 budget.

References

External links

 
 
 
 

2002 films
2002 romantic comedy-drama films
20th Century Fox films
American romantic comedy-drama films
Davis Entertainment films
Films about journalists
Films directed by Stephen Herek
Films produced by John Davis
Films scored by David Newman
Films set in Seattle
Films shot in Vancouver
Films shot in Washington (state)
Regency Enterprises films
Films produced by Arnon Milchan
2000s English-language films
2000s American films